Miss Venezuela 1995 was the 42nd Miss Venezuela pageant, was held in Caracas, Venezuela on September 27, 1995, after weeks of events.  The winner of the pageant was Alicia Machado, Miss Yaracuy.

The pageant was broadcast live on Venevisión from the Poliedro de Caracas in Caracas. At the conclusion of the final night of competition, outgoing titleholder Denyse Floreano, crowned Alicia Machado of Yaracuy as the new Miss Venezuela.

Results

Special awards

§ - Voted By The Press

Delegates
The Miss Venezuela 1995 delegates are:

 Miss Amazonas - María Dolores (Lola) Pérez Fernández
 Miss Anzoátegui - Jenniffer Kristal Milano Hernández
 Miss Apure - Maria Luisa Domínguez Loureiro
 Miss Aragua - Penélope María Sosa Rivero
 Miss Barinas - Roselyn Silveira Mata
 Miss Bolívar - Irene Chuecos Marrero
 Miss Carabobo - Jackqueline del Valle Osorio Castro
 Miss Cojedes - Jacqueline Rivero Matheus
 Miss Costa Oriental - Carla Andreína Steinkopf Struve
 Miss Delta Amacuro - Nayber Torres Barrios
 Miss Dependencias Federales - Angela María Hernández Márquez
 Miss Distrito Federal - Bárbra Briggite Bennett Briceño
 Miss Falcón - Rosanna Teresa Bertoni Barrios
 Miss Guárico - Lorena Lisbeth Loreto Infante
 Miss Lara - Zoraya Paola Villareal Mendoza
 Miss Mérida - Albelena Sanabria Guerrero
 Miss Miranda  - Shakty Pinto Hiller
 Miss Monagas - Daniella Margarita Matheu Briceño
 Miss Municipio Libertador - Melanie Beatriz Nazco Hernández
 Miss Municipio Vargas - Aurymir Coromoto Vincent Martínez
 Miss Nueva Esparta - Jacqueline María Aguilera Marcano
 Miss Península Goajira - Kisvel Gabriela Brito Velásquez
 Miss Portuguesa - Mariangela Garófalo Oliva
 Miss Sucre - Raiza Sulhey Sarmiento Vielma
 Miss Táchira - Marifel Gómez Villafañe
 Miss Trujillo - Mariana Cegarra Félice
 Miss Yaracuy - Joseph Alicia Machado Fajardo
 Miss Zulia - Anielska Montiel Reveról

External links
Miss Venezuela official website

1995 beauty pageants
1995 in Venezuela